Erzincan Binali Yıldırım University is a university in Erzincan, Turkey, with more than 25,000 students.  It has 12 faculties and 12 high schools (tertiary education).

It was established on March 1, 2006, from a number of existing schools. The education school was established in 1967 and the law school was established in 1987. The university plans to offer a program in cemetery management. 

Erzincan Binali Yıldırım University; The year 2020 was among the top 2 thousand universities in the ranking created by the CWUR-Center from World University Rankings. It entered the first 6.8 percent among 20 thousand universities in the ranking.

It is among the first thousand universities in the "Worldwide University Rankings" category, which is determined by U.S. News & World Report every year according to various scientific criteria.

President
 Erdoğan Büyükkasap 2007-2010
 İlyas Çapoğlu 2010-2018
 Akın Levent 2018-....  
The former president, Erdoğan Büyükkasap, appointed in 2007, was found dead on March 18, 2010, apparently having committed suicide.

Academic divisions

Faculties 

 Faculty of Law
 Faculty of Medicine
 Faculty of Pharmacy
 Faculty of Dentistry
 Faculty of Art
 Faculty of Sports Science
 Faculty of Education
 Faculty of Economics and Administrative Sciences
 Faculty of Engineering
 Faculty of Theology
 Faculty of Health Sciences
 Faculty of fine arts

Institutes 
 Institute of Applied Sciences
 Institute of Social Sciences
 Institute of Health Sciences

Research Institutes and Coordinatorships 
 Computer Science Research and Application Institute 
 East Anatolia Earthquake Research and Training Coordinatorship 
 Turkish Peoples Research and Application Coordinatorship 
 Strategic Research Coordinatorship
 Biological Diversity Research and Application Coordinatorship
 Yukarı Fırat Havzası Research and Application Coordinatorship (YUFHAK)
 Erzincan Teknokent Coordinatorship
 MEYOK Coordinatorship
 Project Education Coordinatorship 
 Training of Strategic Development Coordinatorship
 International Relations Coordinatorship

Affiliations
The university is a member of the Caucasus University Association.

References

External links
Official site 

Erzincan
Educational institutions established in 2006
State universities and colleges in Turkey
Buildings and structures in Erzincan Province
2006 establishments in Turkey
Erzincan Binali Yıldırım University